Graham Hay (born 27 November 1965) is a Scottish footballer, who played for Stranraer, Falkirk, Stirling Albion, Clydebank and Airdrieonians. Hay played for Airdrieonians in the 1995 Scottish Cup Final, which they lost 1–0 to Celtic.

Honours
Airdrieonians
Scottish Challenge Cup: 1994–95

References

External links

1965 births
Living people
Scottish footballers
Association football defenders
St Mirren F.C. players
Stranraer F.C. players
Falkirk F.C. players
Stirling Albion F.C. players
Clydebank F.C. (1965) players
Airdrieonians F.C. (1878) players
Maryhill F.C. players
Scottish Football League players
Footballers from Falkirk